Mount Vision is a mountain in Central New York region of New York by Cooperstown. Mount Vision was named by Judge Cooper. Mount Vision is where Cooper's father first glimpsed Otsego Lake in 1785. Otsego Lake is located north-northwest of Mount Vision.

References

Mountains of Otsego County, New York
Mountains of New York (state)